Eskanan (also Romanized as Eskanān, Eskenān, and Eskonān; also known as Asgān, Eshkenān, Eskān, and Iskenān) is a village in Haram Rud-e Sofla Rural District, Samen District, Malayer County, Hamadan Province, Iran. At the 2006 census, its population was 453, in 97 families.

References 

Populated places in Malayer County